The men's 30 kilometre cross-country skiing competition at the 1980 Winter Olympics in Lake Placid, United States, was held on Thursday 14 February at the Mount Van Hoevenberg in Essex County, New York.

Each skier started at half a minute intervals, skiing the entire 30 kilometre course. Sergey Savelyev of the Soviet Union was the 1978 World champion and also the defending Olympic champion from 1976 Olympics in Innsbruck, Austria.

Results
Sources:

References

External links
 Final results (International Ski Federation)

Men's cross-country skiing at the 1980 Winter Olympics
Men's 30 kilometre cross-country skiing at the Winter Olympics